The British Guiana Labour Party (BGCP) was a political party in British Guiana.

History
The BGCP was formed in June 1946, with its leadership included Jung Bahadur Singh, J.A. Nicholson, Hubert Nathaniel Critchlow and Ashton Chase. It contested 13 of the 14 seats in the 1947 elections, winning five of them and becoming the largest party in the Legislative Council.

In 1949 Forbes Burnham became party leader, and the following year it merged with the Political Affairs Committee to form the People's Progressive Party.

References

Defunct political parties in Guyana
1946 establishments in British Guiana
1950 disestablishments in British Guiana
Labour parties
Political parties established in 1946
Political parties disestablished in 1950
Socialist parties in South America
Socialism in Guyana